John Sackville may refer to:

John Sackville (by 1523-47/52), MP for East Grinstead
 John Sackville (died 1557), English MP (1484-1557)
John Sackville (died 1619), MP for East Grinstead
 John Sackville (died 1661), English MP for Rye
 Lord John Sackville (1713–1765), cricket patron and second son of the 1st Duke of Dorset, father of
 John Sackville, 3rd Duke of Dorset (1745–1799), cricket patron and ambassador to France
 John Sackville (actor), English actor

See also
John Sackville Labatt (1880 - 1952) president of the Labatt brewing company and a prominent kidnapping victim